Rod Kush (born December 29, 1956 in Omaha, Nebraska), is also known as "The Krusher". He is a former safety in the National Football League. He played for the Buffalo Bills and the Houston Oilers. He then decided to open a furniture store called "Rod Kush's Furniture", which went out of business in 2007. Later, Kush opened his new chain of furniture stores, "7 Day Furniture", with locations in both Omaha and Lincoln, Nebraska. He previously resided in Gretna, Nebraska before moving to Ashland, Nebraska. His previous house in Gretna fell into disrepair and was demolished. The land now includes a senior living home.

References

External links

1956 births
Living people
Sportspeople from Omaha, Nebraska
American football safeties
Nebraska–Omaha Mavericks football players
Buffalo Bills players
Houston Oilers players
Players of American football from Nebraska